Barry Diamond (born 20 March 1960) is a Scottish former professional footballer who played as a forward in the Football League.

References

1960 births
Living people
Scottish footballers
Sportspeople from Dumbarton
Footballers from West Dunbartonshire
Association football forwards
Barrow A.F.C. players
Workington A.F.C. players
Rochdale A.F.C. players
Stockport County F.C. players
Halifax Town A.F.C. players
Wrexham A.F.C. players
Gainsborough Trinity F.C. players
Morecambe F.C. players
Colne Dynamoes F.C. players
Mossley A.F.C. players
Hyde United F.C. players
Altrincham F.C. players
Chorley F.C. players
Rossendale United F.C. players
Leigh Genesis F.C. players
National League (English football) players
English Football League players